Ramadhan dan Ramona is a 1992 Indonesian comedy film directed by Chaerul Umam. The film won five awards at the Indonesian Film Festival in 1993.

Accolades

References 

Citra Award winners
1990s Indonesian-language films
1992 films
Indonesian comedy films
1992 comedy films